Slums of Beverly Hills is a 1998 American comedy-drama film written and directed by Tamara Jenkins, and starring Natasha Lyonne, Alan Arkin, Marisa Tomei, David Krumholtz, Kevin Corrigan, Jessica Walter and Carl Reiner. The story follows a teenage girl (Lyonne) struggling to grow up in 1976 in a lower-middle-class nomadic Jewish family that relocates every few months.

The film received mixed to positive critical reviews, and has gradually become a cult classic.

Plot
Fourteen-year-old Vivian Abromowitz's family are penniless nomads, moving from one cheap apartment to another in 1976 Beverly Hills, so that Vivian and her brothers can attend the city's prestigious local schools. Their father, Murray, is a divorced 65-year-old, working as an unsuccessful Oldsmobile salesman whose cars are selling poorly due in large part to the energy crisis of the time.

Vivian's wealthy uncle Mickey regularly sends the family money to help them survive. When Mickey's 29-year-old daughter Rita escapes from a rehab facility, Murray offers her shelter if Mickey will pay for a plush apartment. Vivian must babysit her adult cousin, ensuring that she attends nursing school and avoids pills and alcohol. However, Vivian has her own problems: she is curious about sex, likes an apparently-twenty-something neighbor, Eliot, has inherited her mother's ample breasts, and wants a family that does not embarrass her.

Vivian's older brother Ben aspires to a show business career, while her father aspires to female companionship but would not give in to wealthy lady-friend Doris Zimmerman's desire that he send his kids back East to live with his ex-wife. Vivian's younger brother Rickey simply aspires to obtain attention.

Vivian and Rita are close and sometimes speak in gibberish, or Pig Latin. Vivian learns that Rita has no wish to attend nursing school and also has no idea as to what to do with her life. Murray attempts to cover up Rita's lack of progress at nursing school when Mickey asks for progress reports. Eventually, Mickey, frustrated at having to support his brother's family and also learning of their deception concerning his daughter (who is pregnant), explodes during a meeting between the two families, telling Murray he is tired of sending them money. Vivian snaps and stabs Mickey in the leg with a fork. Rita gets on a plane with her now outraged parents. Depressed and dejected, Murray once again packs the kids into his car and they take off. In an attempt to cheer her father up, Vivian suggests that the family stop for a cheap steak at Sizzler for breakfast — a ritual regularly suggested by their father as a means of showing affection to his children, despite their indifference to it or him.

Cast

 Alan Arkin as Murray Abromowitz, Vivian's father
 Natasha Lyonne as Vivian Abromowitz, a fourteen-year-old girl who is the story's main protagonist
 Kevin Corrigan as Eliot Arenson, Vivian's neighbor and sometime boyfriend
 Jessica Walter as Doris, Murray's new love interest
 Rita Moreno as Belle Abromowitz, Mickey's wife and Rita's mother
 David Krumholtz as Ben Abromowitz, Vivian's 18-year-old brother
 Eli Marienthal as Rickey Abromowitz, Vivian's 10-year-old brother
 Carl Reiner as Mickey, Murray's older brother
 Marisa Tomei as Rita Abromowitz, Vivian's cousin
 Mena Suvari as Rachel Hoffman

Production 
The film is loosely based on writer-director Tamara Jenkins' experiences as a youth moving around different apartments in the Beverly Hills area with her lower-middle-class family. Jenkins wrote the script at the Sundance Filmmakers' Lab, where Sundance founder Robert Redford got ahold of her screenplay and expressed interest in producing it. Redford said he related to Jenkins' experiences of having "grown up as an 'outsider'...not at all a member of the club but a sideline observer from the wrong side of the tracks." Redford is credited as an executive producer on the film.

Reception

Box office 
Slums of Beverly Hills earned a total of $5,502,773 at the domestic box office. On its opening weekend, it garnered $125,561 from seven theaters in the United States.

Critical reception
On Rotten Tomatoes, the film is certified "Fresh", with an 81% approval rating based on 62 reviews, for an average score of 7/10, with the site's consensus describing the film as "Warm, real, and hilarious." Reviewers have praised the 1970s production design, the humor, and the acting as "dead-on."

Roger Ebert awarded the film three stars out of four, and said of lead actress Natasha Lyonne, "[she] has the film's most important role, and is the key to the comedy. She does a good job of looking incredulous, and there's a lot in her life to be incredulous about. She also has a nice pragmatic approach to sexuality, as in a scene where she consults a plastic surgeon about on-the-spot breast reduction." He also stated, "...basically I enjoyed Slums of Beverly Hills—for the wisecracking, for the family squabbles, for the notion of squatters who stake a claim in a Beverly Hills where money, after all, is not the only currency."

San Francisco Chronicle reviewer Ruthe Stein stated, "While touching on serious issues such as loss, this coming-of-age story is first and foremost a comedy, and a hilarious one at that. It never strains to be funny. The humor derives from the deadpan responses of family members to circumstances beyond their control." She also wrote, "Set in the mid-'70s, Slums gets the period right, from the burnt orange shag carpet on the floor of the family's temporary digs to the dorky clothes and extreme hairstyles. Even the saleslady who sells Vivian her first bra has the overly made-up look of the time. The Abramowitzes' behavior when they go out to eat—complaining about the service and that there's too much salt in the food—may seem to border on a Jewish stereotype. But it's also dead-on."

Accolades

Soundtrack
 "Give Up the Funk (Tear the Roof off the Sucker)" – Parliament
 "I'd Love to Change the World" – Ten Years After
 "Shambala" – Three Dog Night
 "Up the Escalator" – Rolfe Kent
 "A Fool in Love" – Ike And Tina Turner
 "Papa Loves Mambo" – Perry Como
 "You and Your Folks, Me and My Folks" – Funkadelic
 "Measuring Up" – Rolfe Kent
 "Before the Next Teardrop Falls" – Freddie Fender
 "Luck Be a Lady" – David Krumholtz
 "Let Your Love Flow" – The Bellamy Brothers
 "Escalator" – Rolfe Kent
 "Your Perverted Arms" – Rolfe Kent
 "Rita" – Rolfe Kent
 "We're Nomads" – Rolfe Kent

References

External links
 
 
 
 
 
 

1998 films
1998 comedy-drama films
1998 directorial debut films
1998 independent films
1990s coming-of-age comedy-drama films
American coming-of-age comedy-drama films
Juvenile sexuality in films
Films about dysfunctional families
Films set in 1976
Films set in Beverly Hills, California
1990s English-language films
Films about Jews and Judaism
Films directed by Tamara Jenkins
Films produced by Michael Nozik
Films scored by Rolfe Kent
Films with screenplays by Tamara Jenkins
Films set in the 1970s
1990s American films